Grantley John Stevens is the Commissioner of the South Australian Police and State Coordinator for the COVID-19 pandemic in South Australia.

Police career
Stevens started in the South Australian Police around 1986. Through his career, he has been involved in a number of high-profile programs. He has experience in counter terrorism, community programs, drug and alcohol management and human resource management. He led the police response to child sexual abuse from 2004 and also domestic violence in the community.

As a senior sergeant, Stevens was awarded the National Medal for long (15 years) service on 27 February 2001. He was assistant commissioner when he was awarded the Australian Police Medal in the 2012 Australia Day Honours.

Stevens studied for a Bachelor of Business (Human Resource Development) and Graduate Certificate of Management at the University of South Australia.

Stevens was appointed deputy commissioner in September 2012. He was announced as the next Commissioner in March 2015 and took up the job on 21 July 2015.

Stevens was promoted to the role of Police Commissioner on 21 July 2015.

As the state emergency coordinator, he declared a state of emergency for the COVID-19 pandemic on 22 March 2020. The declaration was extended many times.

Personal life
Stevens is married to Emma, and has one daughter and four sons.

In January 2022, Stevens was diagnosed with COVID-19 and reported to be isolating in a private residence, while continuing in his role remotely.

References

Living people
Australian police officers
Year of birth missing (living people)